Rice College (Coláiste an Rísigh in Irish) is a secondary school in Ennis, County Clare, Ireland founded in 1826. It is also a C.B.S with a house on the property where "Brothers" still reside. No Brothers teach in the secondary school but it was previously run by the religious order. It was formerly an all-boys school, although girls were first admitted to repeat their leaving certificate examinations in 1985, it became coeducational in 1997.  In 2006 construction started on an extension and was completed in early 2007.

The school offers a wide range of subjects for students to choose from and since 2019 have required first years to choose a language and 2 optional subjects before they arrive. Transition year was introduced in 2022 with a class of 20-24 students being taken on.

Sport
In 1962, Rice College won their only Dr. Harty Cup (Munster 'A' Colleges Hurling), defeating bitter local rivals and twenty-one times champions, St. Flannan's, Ennis in the final in front of a sell-out crowd in Cusack Park.
As a result of this they went on to compete in the Dr. Croke Cup (All-Ireland 'A' Colleges Hurling) final later that year, unfortunately losing out to St. Peter's College, Wexford in a tight affair.

Rice College also competed in the 1963 Dr. Harty Cup decider but lost out to St. Finbarr's, Cork.

On December 15, 2021, Rice College defeated Our Lady's, Templemore in the Munster Under 16 ½ B Corn Shéamuis Uí Dhonnchú final on a scoreline of 1–15 to 1-09, ending a 42-year drought since the school's last win in 1979. En route to the final they dismissed Castletroy College, St. Joseph's Tulla, John the Baptist CS Hospital and Charleville CBS, scoring a combined total of 13–85. They were spurred on that  day by their 16th man, 'Rice Ultras', a group of over 250 students who made their own way down with flags, bodhráns and flares to support.

References

Buildings and structures in Ennis
Congregation of Christian Brothers secondary schools in the Republic of Ireland
Educational institutions established in 1826
Education in Ennis
1826 establishments in Ireland
Secondary schools in County Clare